Let's Go Places is a 1930 American Pre-Code musical film made by the Fox Film Corporation.

Directed by Frank R. Strayer, the film uses a screenplay by William K. Wells which is based on a story by Andrew Bennison. It was choreographed by Danny Dare. The film stars Joseph Wagstaff, Lola Lane, Sharon Lynn, Frank Richardson, Walter Catlett, Dixie Lee, Ilka Chase, and Larry Steers.

Cast
Joseph Wagstaff - Paul Adams
Lola Lane - Marjorie Lorraine
Sharon Lynn - Virginia Gordon
Frank Richardson - J. Speed Quinn
Walter Catlett - Rex Wardell
Dixie Lee - Dixie
Ilka Chase - Mrs. Du Bonnet
Larry Steers - Ben King

unbilled
Betty Grable - Chorine
Charles Judels - Du Bonnet
Eddie Kane - Frenchman

Preservation status
According to IMDB, Let's Go Places is now considered a lost film.

See also
List of lost films

References

External links

AllMovie.com

1930 films
1930 musical films
Fox Film films
American musical films
Films directed by Frank R. Strayer
Lost American films
American black-and-white films
1930 lost films
1930s American films
1930s English-language films